Branko "Sosa" Babić (born 11 September 1950) is a Serbian football manager and former player.

Playing career
During his playing career, Babić represented Osijek (Yugoslavia) and Beringen (Belgium) in the 1970s. He made five league appearances for the Belgian club in the 1975–76 season.

Managerial career
During his managerial career, Babić worked at numerous clubs in his homeland and abroad. He was manager of Mito HollyHock (2000), Čukarički (2003–04), OFK Beograd (May 2004–October 2005), Čukarički (2006–07), Budućnost Podgorica (November 2007–September 2008), Vojvodina (October 2009–March 2010), Persis Solo (2011), OFK Beograd (January–May 2012) and Vojvodina (January–May 2014). Subsequently, Babić also served as caretaker manager of Gyeongnam FC (August–December 2014).

With Budućnost Podgorica, Babić won the 2007–08 Montenegrin First League. He also won the 2013–14 Serbian Cup with Vojvodina. Now he is the president of Belgrade football managers and vice president of football managers of Serbia in Football Association of Serbia.

Managerial statistics

Honours
Budućnost Podgorica
 Montenegrin First League: 2007–08

Vojvodina
 Serbian Cup: 2013–14

References

External links
 
 

1950 births
Living people
People from Zemun
Yugoslav footballers
Serbian footballers
Association football midfielders
K. Beringen F.C. players
Serbian football managers
Serbian SuperLiga managers
FK Budućnost Podgorica managers
FK Čukarički managers
FK Vojvodina managers
Gyeongnam FC managers
J2 League managers
Mito HollyHock managers
NK Osijek players
OFK Beograd managers
Yugoslav expatriate footballers
Serbian expatriate football managers
Yugoslav expatriate sportspeople in Belgium
Expatriate footballers in Belgium
Serbian expatriate sportspeople in Indonesia
Expatriate football managers in Indonesia
Serbian expatriate sportspeople in Japan
Expatriate football managers in Japan
Serbian expatriate sportspeople in Montenegro
Expatriate football managers in Montenegro
Serbian expatriate sportspeople in South Korea
Expatriate football managers in South Korea